Blackgaze is a fusion genre combining elements of black metal and shoegaze. The word is a blend of the names of the two genres, described by The Guardian as "the buzz term for a new school of bands taking black metal out of the shadows and melding its blast beats, dungeon wailing and razorwire guitars with the more reflective melodies of post-rock, shoegaze and post-hardcore." According to Exclaim!, blackgaze "marries the harsh, alien instrumentation of black metal with the mellower, dreamy soundscapes of shoegaze."

Influenced by atmospheric black metal bands like Ulver and Summoning, the genre was pioneered by French musician Neige around 2005 through the projects Alcest and Amesoeurs and has risen to prominence with the success of American group Deafheaven. The Guardian named Deafheaven "blackgaze's de facto poster boys, the most likely to open up black metal to an even wider audience", and Exclaim! described their second album Sunbather – the most critically acclaimed album of 2013 on Metacritic – as seminal to blackgaze.

Development 
Michael Nelson of Stereogum tracks the origins of blackgaze to the early work of French musician Neige, who pioneered the fusion through projects including Alcest, Amesoeurs and Lantlôs. According to Nelson, Alcest's 2005 EP Le Secret was "the birth of blackgaze"; he noted that it sounded "like a Cocteau Twins/Burzum collaborative split" and that "[r]oughly half the time, vocals were delivered in an angelic coo; the other half, they were a raw, distant shriek". Natalie Zina Walschots of Exclaim! also credits Neige with pioneering the style, while noting that American band Deafheaven has pushed the genre to "greater prominence". Deafheaven's vocalist George Clarke himself cites the work of Alcest as "the blueprint" for the band's musical direction.

Reception 
Some fans of traditional black metal and heavy metal more generally have criticized the genre for its success among those outside of the metal community, most prominently after the release of Deafheaven's 2013 album Sunbather. However, this reaction was vastly overshadowed by critical acclaim for the album, which became one of the defining releases of blackgaze. Deafheaven have also managed to gather widespread appeal by way of playing mainstream music festivals, often being one of the sole metal-related acts performing.

See also 
List of blackgaze artists

References 

Heavy metal genres
Black metal subgenres
Shoegaze
21st-century music genres